José Moreno Villa (16 February 1887, Málaga – 25 April 1955, México) was a Spanish poet and member of the Generation of '27. He was a man of many talents: narrator, essayist, literary critic, artist, painter, columnist, researcher, archivist, librarian and archaeologist. He also taught at universities in the United States and México.

Biography
Moreno Villa was born into a comfortable middle-class family in Málaga. His father, José Moreno Castañeda, was a conservative politician and his grandfather, Miguel Moreno Mazón, had been a conservative mayor of Málaga. After finishing high school when he was 17 years old, his parents sent him to Freiburg im Breisgau in Germany to read chemistry. He didn't complete his studies.

He returned to Málaga in 1910 and decided to settle in Madrid. There he became familiar with personalities such as Ortega y Gasset, Enrique de Mesa, Ramón Pérez de Ayala, Enrique Díez Canedo, Juan Ramón Jiménez and Pío Baroja, among others. He was employed by the Editorial Calleja from 1916 to 1921, on the recommendation of Juan Ramón Jiménez. He wrote for magazines such as España, Revista de Occidente and El Sol.

He lived at the Residencia de Estudiantes in Madrid for nearly 20 years, during which he benefitted both intellectually and socially. With the emergence of the Spanish Republic, Moreno Villa was appointed Director of the Archives of the National Palace.

In 1927, he published a series of essays titled Pruebas de Nueva York (Observations of New York), inspired by his stay in New York City with his then fiancée, Florence Louchheim, whom he had met in Madrid at the Residencia. Florence became the protagonist of a book of poetry that Moreno Villa would also publish upon his return from the United States, called Jacinta la pelirroja (Jacinta the Redhead).

With the outbreak of the Spanish Civil War, he moved to Valencia for a short time until he was exiled to the United States, where he was employed in various cultural and educational posts at Princeton University. Shortly afterwards he moved to Mexico, where he married, had a son, and developed much of his work.

Works

Poetry
Garba (1913)
El pasajero (1914)
Luchas de Pena y Alegría y su transfiguración (1915)
Evoluciones. Cuentos, Caprichos, Bestiario, Epitafios y Obras paralelas (1918)
Colección. Poesías (1924)
Jacinta la Pelirroja. Poema en poemas y dibujos (1929). Ed. by Humberto Huergo Cardoso. Barcelona: Anthropos, 2021.
Carambas (1931)
Puentes que no acaban. Poemas (1933)
Salón sin muros (1936)
Puerta severa (1941)
La noche del Verbo (1942)
Voz en vuelo a su cuna (Avance de ese libro inédito) Ed. Ángel Caffarena Such (1961)
Voz en vuelo a su cuna prologue León Felipe, epilogue Juan Rejano (1961)
Poesías completas Ed. Juan Pérez de Ayala (1998)
La música que llevaba. Antología poética Ed. Juan Cano Ballesta (2010)

Other works
Velázquez (1920)
Patrañas (1921)
Dibujos del Instituto Jovellanos (1926)
Pruebas de Nueva York (1927)
Locos, enanos, negros y niños palaciegos (1939)
Cornucopia de México (1940)
Doce manos mexicanas, datos para la historia literaria (1941)
La escultura colonial mexicana (1941)
Vida en claro, Autobiografía (1944)
Leyendo a San Juan de la Cruz, Garcilaso, Fr. Luis de León, Bécquer, etc (1944)
Probetería y locura (1945)
Lo que sabía mi loro (1945)
Lo mexicano en las artes plásticas (1948)
Los autores como actores (1951)
Análisis de los poemas de Picasso (1996)
José Moreno Villa escribe artículos (1906-1937). Ed. Carolina Galán Caballero (1999)
Temas de arte. Selección de escritos periodísticos sobre pintura, escultura, arquitectura y música (1916-1954). Ed. by Humberto Huergo Cardoso. Valencia: Pre-Textos, 2001.
Ideografías de José Moreno Villa (2007)
Medio mundo y otro medio. Memorias escogidas. Ed. by Humberto Huergo Cardoso. Valencia: Pre-Textos, 2010.
Función contra forma y otros escritos sobre arquitectura madrileña 1927-1935. Ed. by Humberto Huergo Cardodo. Valencia: Iseebooks, 2010.

References

External links
Group José Moreno Villa fans on facebook

1887 births
1955 deaths
People from Málaga
Spanish essayists
Spanish translators
Literary critics of Spanish
Spanish academics
Mexican architectural historians
Princeton University faculty
Generation of '27
Spanish male poets
20th-century Spanish poets
20th-century translators
Male essayists
20th-century essayists
20th-century Spanish male writers